Weeting-with-Broomhill is a civil parish in the English county of Norfolk.
The area of the parish includes the village of Weeting. For the purposes of local government, it falls within the district of Breckland. The parish covers the area to the north of Brandon.

The parish contains a neolithic site known as Grimes Graves. This is an extensive system of stone-age flint mines. Now a scheduled monument looked after by English Heritage.

Notes

External links
Council website: http://blofieldpc.norfolkparishes.gov.uk/weetingwithbroomhill/

Civil parishes in Norfolk
Breckland District